Colin Dunlop may refer to:

 Colin Dunlop (bishop) (1897–1968), Anglican bishop 
 Colin Dunlop (politician) (1775–1837), Scottish politician and industrialist
 Colin Dunlop (sailor) (born 1962), Fijian sailor
 Colin Dunlop of Carmyle (1706–1777), Scottish tobacco lord and banker